Tetrablemma medioculatum is a species of spider of the genus Tetrablemma. The nominate subspecies is endemic to Sri Lanka. Two other subspecies can be found, both of which are endemic to India.

Subspecies
Tetrablemma medioculatum cochinense Lehtinen, 1981 - India
Tetrablemma medioculatum gangeticum Lehtinen, 1981 - India
Tetrablemma medioculatum medioculatum - Sri Lanka

See also
 List of Tetrablemmidae species

References

Tetrablemmidae
Endemic fauna of Sri Lanka
Spiders of Asia
Spiders described in 1873